"'Voltage" is a song by the South Korean girl group Itzy. It is the group's first Japanese maxi single. The song was released by Warner Music Japan on April 6, 2022.

Composition 
The single contains 4 tracks, including the title song 'Voltage' and the B-side 'Spice' with the instrumental versions of both songs. "Voltage" was written by Mayu Wakisaka who wrote some of Twice's hit songs such as Candy Pop and Knock Knock. It was described as pop-rock track that characterized by strong rap, Lyrically, it contains a message of that 'We will move forward confidently' by comparing the group's exhilarating energy to the song name 'Voltage'. It was composed in the key of F Minor, with a tempo of 107 beats per minute.

Promotion 
To promote "Voltage", Itzy performed the song at Venue 101.

Commercial performance 
Prior to the release of the official release, the music video was released on March 24, it helped the single to climbed to the second place on Oricon daily single chart on April 5. In addition, it took the top spot on the Japanese Tower Records Daily Sales Chart, K-pop/World Reservation Chart, and K-pop/World Sales Chart, As of the 6th, it ranked 2nd on the Japanese iTunes K-Pop Daily Album Chart and 8th on the Worldwide iTunes Album Chart.

Track listing

Credits and personnel 
Credits adapted from Melon.

 Itzy – vocals
 Mayu Wakisaka – lyricist
 Charlotte Wilson – composer, arranger
  Frankie Day (THE HUB) – composer, arranger
  Ayushy – composer,  arranger
  THE HUB 88 (THE HUB) – composer, arranger
 SELAH – composer, arranger

Charts

Weekly charts

Year-end charts

Release history

References

2022 singles
Itzy songs
2022 songs